Simon Kean (born 11 January 1989) is a Canadian professional boxer. As an amateur he qualified for the 2012 Summer Olympics along with countryman Custio Clayton.

Amateur career
Kean was a semi-finalist and third-place finisher in the super-heavyweight division at the 2012 American Boxing Olympic Qualification Tournament. Three spots were available for qualification at super-heavyweight and Kean qualified over the other semi-finalist since his loss was a knockout by the eventual winner Ítalo Perea.  Qualification being dependent on how the opponent performed in later rounds was controversial and will not be used in future Olympics. At the 2012 Olympics he edged out Tony Yoka but lost to Ivan Dychko. He participated at the 2015 Pan American Games in Toronto. He lost in the quarter-final against American Cam F. Awesome. He had an amateur record of 54-15.

Professional boxing record

References

External links
 
 
 
 
 
 

1989 births
Boxers at the 2012 Summer Olympics
Living people
Olympic boxers of Canada
Sportspeople from Trois-Rivières
Super-heavyweight boxers
Canadian male boxers
Boxers at the 2015 Pan American Games
Pan American Games competitors for Canada